Live at Sirius is a live album by Irish band Tír na nÓg and was released in June 2010, celebrating the duo's 40th birthday. It has been recorded during two gigs on August 21, 22, 2009 at the Sirius Art Centre in Cobh. They performed tracks taken from their all three studio albums or written during the Tír na nÓg first era, excepting a few ones. Two songs are covers from The Rolling Stones and Nick Drake.

Track listing

Personnel
Sonny Condell – vocal, guitar, jews harp, Moroccan pottery drums
Leo O'Kelly – vocal, guitar, violin, drum programming

Production
 Louise McCormick – recording, mixing at Manor Studio, Cobh
 John Crone – recording
 David O'Toole – cover design
 Sonny Condell – front sleeve photography
 Colin Gillen – live photo

Release history

References

2010 live albums
Tír na nÓg (band) albums